Immigration has been a major source of population growth and cultural change throughout much of the history of the United States. In absolute numbers, the United States has a larger immigrant population than any other country in the world, with 47 million immigrants as of 2015. This represents 19.1% of the 244 million international migrants worldwide, and 14.4% of the United States' population.

According to the 2016 Yearbook of Immigration Statistics, the United States admitted a total of 1.18 million legal immigrants (618k new arrivals, 565k status adjustments) in 2016. Of these, 48% were the immediate relatives of United States citizens, 20% were family-sponsored, 13% were refugees or asylum seekers, 12% were employment-based preferences, 4.2% were part of the Diversity Immigrant Visa program, 1.4% were victims of a crime (U1) or their family members were (U2 to U5), and 1.0% who were granted the Special Immigrant Visa (SIV) for Iraqis and Afghans employed by the United States Government. The remaining 0.4% included small numbers from several other categories, including 0.2% who were granted suspension of deportation as an immediate relative of a citizen (Z13); persons admitted under the Nicaraguan and Central American Relief Act; children born after the issuance of a parent's visa; and certain parolees from the former Soviet Union, Cambodia, Laos, and Vietnam who were denied refugee status.

Between 1921 and 1965, policies such as the national origins formula limited immigration and naturalization opportunities for people from areas outside Western Europe. Exclusion laws enacted as early as the 1880s generally prohibited or severely restricted immigration from Asia, and quota laws enacted in the 1920s curtailed Southern and Eastern European immigration. The civil rights movement led to the replacement of these ethnic quotas with per-country limits for family-sponsored and employment-based preference visas. Since then, the number of first-generation immigrants living in the United States has quadrupled. The total immigrant population has stalled in recent years, especially since the election of Donald Trump and the COVID-19 pandemic. Census estimates show 45.3 million foreign born residents in March 2018 and 45.4 million in September 2021; the lowest 3 year increase in decades.

Research suggests that immigration is beneficial to the United States economy. With few exceptions, the evidence suggests that on average, immigration has positive economic effects on the native population, but it is mixed as to whether low-skilled immigration adversely affects low-skilled natives. Studies also show that immigrants have lower crime rates than natives in the United States. The economic, social, and political aspects of immigration have caused controversy regarding such issues as maintaining ethnic homogeneity, workers for employers versus jobs for non-immigrants, settlement patterns, impact on upward social mobility, crime, and voting behavior.

History

American immigration history can be viewed in four epochs: the colonial period, the mid-19th century, the start of the 20th century, and post-1965. Each period brought distinct national groups, races and ethnicities to the United States.

Colonial period
During the 17th century, approximately 400,000 English people migrated to colonial America. They comprised 83.5% of the white population at the time of the first census in 1790. From 1700 to 1775, between 350,000 and 500,000 Europeans immigrated: estimates vary in sources. Regarding English settlers of the 18th century, one source says 52,000 English migrated during the period of 1701 to 1775, although this figure is likely too low. 400,000–450,000 of the 18th-century migrants were Scots, Scots-Irish from Ulster, Germans, Swiss, and French Huguenots. Over half of all European immigrants to Colonial America during the 17th and 18th centuries arrived as indentured servants. They numbered 350,000. From 1770 to 1775 (the latter year being when the American Revolutionary War began), 7,000 English, 15,000 Scots, 13,200 Scots-Irish, 5,200 Germans, and 3,900 Irish Catholics migrated to the Thirteen Colonies. According to Butler (2000), up to half of English migrants in the 18th century may have been young, single men who were well-skilled, trained artisans, like the Huguenots. Based on scholarly analysis of names recorded at the time of the first census in 1790, English was the largest single ancestry in all U.S. states, ranging from a high of 82% in Massachusetts to a low of 35.3% in Pennsylvania, where Germans accounted for 33.3%.

Origins of immigrant stock in 1790
The Census Bureau published preliminary estimates of the origins of the colonial American population by scholarly classification of the names of all White heads of families recorded in the 1790 Census in a 1909 report entitled A Century of Population Growth. These initial estimates were scrutinized and rejected following passage of the Immigration Act of 1924, when the government required accurate official estimates of the origins of the colonial stock population as basis for computing National Origins Formula immigration quotas in the 1920s. In 1927, proposed quotas based on CPG figures were rejected by the President's Committee chaired by the Secretaries of State, Commerce, and Labor, with the President reporting to Congress "the statistical and historical information available raises grave doubts as to the whole value of these computations as the basis for the purposes intended". Concluding that CPG "had not been accepted by scholars as better than a first approximation of the truth", an extensive scientific revision was produced, in collaboration with the American Council of Learned Societies, as basis for computing contemporary legal immigration quotas. For this task scholars estimated the proportion of names of unique derivation from each of the major national stocks present in the population as of the 1790 census. The final results, later also published in the journal of the American Historical Association, are presented below:

Historians estimate that fewer than one million immigrants moved to the United States from Europe between 1600 and 1799. By comparison, in the first federal census, in 1790, the population of the United States was enumerated to be 3,929,214.

Early United States era
The Naturalization Act of 1790 limited naturalization to "free white persons"; it was expanded to include black people in the 1860s and Asian people in the 1950s. This made the United States an outlier, since laws that made racial distinctions were uncommon in the world in the 18th century.

In the early years of the United States, immigration (not counting the enslaved, who were treated as merchandise rather than people) was fewer than 8,000 people a year, including French refugees from the slave revolt in Haiti. Legal importation of enslaved African was prohibited after 1808, though many were smuggled in to sell. After 1820, immigration gradually increased. From 1836 to 1914, over 30 million Europeans migrated to the United States. The death rate on these transatlantic voyages was high, during which one in seven travelers died. 

After an initial wave of immigration from China following the California Gold Rush, Congress passed its first immigration law, the Page Act of 1875 which banned Chinese women. This was followed by the Chinese Exclusion Act of 1882, banning virtually all immigration from China until the law's repeal in 1943. In the late 1800s, immigration from other Asian countries, especially to the West Coast, became more common.

Exclusion Era
The peak year of European immigration was in 1907, when 1,285,349 persons entered the country. By 1910, 13.5 million immigrants were living in the United States.

While the Chinese Exclusion Act of 1882 had already excluded immigrants from China, the immigration of people from Asian countries in addition to China was banned by the Immigration Act of 1917, also known as the Asiatic Barred Zone Act, which also banned homosexuals, people with intellectual disability, and people with an anarchist worldview.  The Emergency Quota Act was enacted in 1921, limiting immigration from the Eastern Hemisphere by national quotas equal to 3 percent of the number of foreign-born from each nation in the 1910 census. The temporary quota system was superseded by the National Origins Formula of the Immigration Act of 1924, which computed national quotas as a fraction of 150,000 in proportion to the national origins of the entire White American population as of the 1920 census, except those having origins in the nonquota countries of the Western Hemisphere (which remained unrestricted).
	
While the Chinese Exclusion Act of 1882 had already excluded immigrants from China, the immigration of people from Asian countries in addition to China was banned by the Immigration Act of 1917, also known as the Asiatic Barred Zone Act, which also banned homosexuals, people with intellectual disability, and people with an anarchist worldview.  The Emergency Quota Act was enacted in 1921, followed by the Immigration Act of 1924. The 1924 Act was aimed at further restricting immigrants from Southern and Eastern Europe, particularly Italian, Slavic, and Jewish people, who had begun to enter the country in large numbers beginning in the 1890s. The 1924 Act also consolidated the prohibition of Asian immigration.

Origins of immigrant stock in 1920
The National Origins Formula was a unique computation which attempted to measure the total contributions of "blood" from each national origin as a share of the total stock of White Americans in 1920, counting immigrants, children of immigrants, and the grandchildren of immigrants (and later generations), in addition to estimating the colonial stock population descended from the population who had immigrated in the colonial period and were enumerated in the 1790 census. European Americans remained predominant, although there were shifts toward Southern, Central, and Eastern Europe from immigration in the period 1790 to 1920. The restrictive immigration quota system established by the Immigration Act of 1924, revised and re-affirmed by the Immigration and Nationality Act of 1952, sought to preserve this demographic makeup of America by allotting quotas in proportion to how much blood each national origin had contributed to the total stock of the population in 1920, as presented below:

Immigration patterns of the 1930s were affected by the Great Depression. In the final prosperous year, 1929, there were 279,678 immigrants recorded, but in 1933, only 23,068 moved to the U.S. In the early 1930s, more people emigrated from the United States than to it. The U.S. government sponsored a Mexican Repatriation program which was intended to encourage people to voluntarily move to Mexico, but thousands were deported against their will. Altogether, approximately 400,000 Mexicans were repatriated; half of them were US citizens. Most of the Jewish refugees fleeing the Nazis and World War II were barred from coming to the United States. In the post-war era, the Justice Department launched Operation Wetback, under which 1,075,168 Mexicans were deported in 1954.

Since 1965
The Immigration and Nationality Act of 1965, also known as the Hart-Cellar Act, abolished the system of national-origin quotas. By equalizing immigration policies, the act resulted in new immigration from non-European nations, which changed the ethnic demographics of the United States. In 1970, 60% of immigrants were from Europe; this decreased to 15% by 2000. In 1990, George H. W. Bush signed the Immigration Act of 1990, which increased legal immigration to the United States by 40%. In 1991, Bush signed the Armed Forces Immigration Adjustment Act 1991, allowing foreign service members who had served 12 or more years in the US Armed Forces to qualify for permanent residency and, in some cases, citizenship.

In November 1994, California voters passed Proposition 187 amending the state constitution, denying state financial aid to illegal immigrants. The federal courts voided this change, ruling that it violated the federal constitution.

Appointed by Bill Clinton, the U.S. Commission on Immigration Reform recommended reducing legal immigration from about 800,000 people per year to approximately 550,000. While an influx of new residents from different cultures presents some challenges, "the United States has always been energized by its immigrant populations", said President Bill Clinton in 1998. "America has constantly drawn strength and spirit from wave after wave of immigrants... They have proved to be the most restless, the most adventurous, the most innovative, the most industrious of people."

In 2001, President George W. Bush discussed an accord with Mexican President Vincente Fox. Due to the September 11 attacks, the possible accord did not occur. From 2005 to 2013, the US Congress discussed various ways of controlling immigration. The Senate and House were unable to reach an agreement.

Nearly 14 million immigrants entered the United States from 2000 to 2010, and over one million persons were naturalized as U.S. citizens in 2008. The per-country limit applies the same maximum on the number of visas to all countries regardless of their population and has therefore had the effect of significantly restricting immigration of persons born in populous nations such as Mexico, China, India, and the Philippines—the leading countries of origin for legally admitted immigrants to the United States in 2013; nevertheless, China, India, and Mexico were the leading countries of origin for immigrants overall to the United States in 2013, regardless of legal status, according to a U.S. Census Bureau study.

Nearly 8 million people immigrated to the United States from 2000 to 2005; 3.7 million of them entered without papers.  In 1986 president Ronald Reagan signed immigration reform that gave amnesty to 3 million undocumented immigrants in the country. Hispanic immigrants suffered job losses during the late-2000s recession, but since the recession's end in June 2009, immigrants posted a net gain of 656,000 jobs. Over 1 million immigrants were granted legal residence in 2011.

For those who enter the US illegally across the Mexico–United States border and elsewhere, migration is difficult, expensive and dangerous. Virtually all undocumented immigrants have no avenues for legal entry to the United States due to the restrictive legal limits on green cards, and lack of immigrant visas for low-skilled workers. Participants in debates on immigration in the early 21st century called for increasing enforcement of existing laws governing illegal immigration to the United States, building a barrier along some or all of the  Mexico-U.S. border, or creating a new guest worker program. Through much of 2006 the country and Congress was engaged in a debate about these proposals.  few of these proposals had become law, though a partial border fence had been approved and subsequently canceled.

Modern reform attempts
Beginning with Ronald Reagan in the 1980s, presidents from both political parties have steadily increased the number of border patrol agents and instituted harsher punitive measures for immigration violations. Examples of these policies include Ronald Reagan's Immigration Reform and Control Act of 1986 and the Clinton-era Prevention Through Deterrence strategy. The sociologist Douglas Massey has argued that these policies have succeeded at producing a perception of border enforcement but have largely failed at preventing emigration from Latin America. Notably, rather than curtailing illegal immigration, the increase in border patrol agents decreased circular migration across the U.S.–Mexico border, thus increasing the population of Hispanics in the U.S.

Presidents from both parties have employed anti-immigrant rhetoric to appeal to their political base or to garner bi-partisan support for their policies.  While Republicans like Reagan and Donald Trump have led the way in framing Hispanic immigrants as criminals, Douglas Massey points out that "the current moment of open racism and xenophobia could not have happened with Democratic acquiescence". For example, while lobbying for his 1986 immigration bill, Reagan framed unauthorized immigration as a "national security" issue and warned that "terrorists and subversives are just two days' driving time" from the border. Later presidents, including Democrats Bill Clinton and Barack Obama, used similar "security" rhetoric in their efforts to court Republican support for comprehensive immigration reform. In his 2013 State of the Union Address, Obama said "real reform means strong border security, and we can build on the progress my administration has already madeputting more boots on the southern border than at any time in our history".

Trump administration policies
ICE reports that it removed 240,255 immigrants in fiscal year 2016, as well as 226,119 in FY2017 and 256,085 in FY2018. Citizens of Central American countries (including Mexico) made up over 90% of removals in FY2017 and over 80% in FY2018.

In January 2017, U.S. President Donald Trump signed an executive order temporarily suspending entry to the United States by nationals of seven Muslim-majority countries. It was replaced by another executive order in March 2017 and by a presidential proclamation in September 2017, with various changes to the list of countries and exemptions. The orders were temporarily suspended by federal courts but later allowed to proceed by the Supreme Court, pending a definite ruling on their legality. Another executive order called for the immediate construction of a wall across the U.S.–Mexico border, the hiring of 5,000 new border patrol agents and 10,000 new immigration officers, and federal funding penalties for sanctuary cities.

The "zero-tolerance" policy was put in place in 2018, which legally allows children to be separated from adults unlawfully entering the United States. This is justified by labeling all adults that enter unlawfully as criminals, thus subjecting them to criminal prosecution. The Trump Administration also argued that its policy had precedent under the Obama Administration, which had opened family detention centers in response to migrants increasingly using children as a way to get adults into the country. However, the Obama Administration detained families together in administrative, rather than criminal, detention.

Other policies focused on what it means for an asylum seeker to claim credible fear. To further decrease the amount of asylum seekers into the United States, Attorney General Jeff Sessions released a decision that restricts those fleeing gang violence and domestic abuse as "private crime", therefore making their claims ineligible for asylum. These new policies that have been put in place are putting many lives at risk, to the point that the ACLU has officially sued Jeff Sessions along with other members of the Trump Administration. The ACLU claims that the policies that are currently being put in place by this Presidential Administration is undermining the fundamental human rights of those immigrating into the United States, specifically women. They also claim that these policies violate decades of settle asylum law.

In April 2020, President Trump said he will sign an executive order to temporarily suspend immigration to the United States because of the COVID-19 pandemic in the United States.

Biden administration policies

In January 2023, regarding the southern border crisis, Joe Biden announced a new immigration policy that would allow 30,000 migrants per month from Cuba, Haiti, Nicaragua and Venezuela but will also expel the migrants from those countries who violate US laws of immigration. The policy has faced criticism from "immigration reform advocates and lawyers who decry any expansion of Title 42."

Origins of the U.S. immigrant population, 1960–2016

Note: "Other Latin America" includes Central America, South America and the Caribbean.

Refugee numbers

According to the Department of State, in the 2016 fiscal year 84,988 refugees were accepted into the US from around the world. In the fiscal year of 2017, 53,691 refugees were accepted to the US. There was a significant decrease after Trump took office; it continued in the fiscal year of 2018 when only 22,405 refugees were accepted into the US. This displays a massive drop in acceptance of refugees since the Trump Administration has been in place.

On September 26, 2019, The Trump administration announced it plans to allow only 18,000 refugees to resettle in the United States in the 2020 fiscal year, its lowest level since the modern program began in 1980.

In 2020 The Trump administration announces that it plans to slash refugee admissions to U.S. for 2021 to a record low, 15,000 refugees down from a cap of 18,000 for 2020. This is the fourth consecutive year of declining refugee admissions under the Trump term.

Contemporary immigration

, approximately half of immigrants living in the United States are from Mexico and other Latin American countries. Many Central Americans are fleeing because of desperate social and economic circumstances in their countries. Some believe that the large number of Central American refugees arriving in the United States can be explained as a "blowback" to policies such as United States military interventions and covert operations that installed or maintained in power authoritarian leaders allied with wealthy land owners and multinational corporations who stop family farming and democratic efforts, which have caused drastically sharp social inequality, wide-scale poverty and rampant crime. Economic austerity dictated by neoliberal policies imposed by the International Monetary Fund and its ally, the U.S., has also been cited as a driver of the dire social and economic conditions, as has the U.S. "War on Drugs", which has been understood as fueling murderous gang violence in the region. Another major migration driver from Central America (Guatemala, Honduras, and El Salvador) are crop failures, which are (partly) caused by climate change. "The current debate... is almost totally about what to do about immigrants when they get here. But the 800-pound gorilla that's missing from the table is what we have been doing there that brings them here, that drives them here", according to Jeff Faux, an economist who is a distinguished fellow at the Economic Policy Institute.

Until the 1930s most legal immigrants were male. By the 1990s women accounted for just over half of all legal immigrants. Contemporary immigrants tend to be younger than the native population of the United States, with people between the ages of 15 and 34 substantially overrepresented. Immigrants are also more likely to be married and less likely to be divorced than native-born Americans of the same age.

Immigrants are likely to move to and live in areas populated by people with similar backgrounds. This phenomenon has remained true throughout the history of immigration to the United States. Seven out of ten immigrants surveyed by Public Agenda in 2009 said they intended to make the U.S. their permanent home, and 71% said if they could do it over again they would still come to the US. In the same study, 76% of immigrants say the government has become stricter on enforcing immigration laws since the September 11, 2001 attacks ("9/11"), and 24% report that they personally have experienced some or a great deal of discrimination.

Public attitudes about immigration in the U.S. were heavily influenced in the aftermath of the 9/11 attacks. After the attacks, 52% of Americans believed that immigration was a good thing overall for the U.S., down from 62% the year before, according to a 2009 Gallup poll. A 2008 Public Agenda survey found that half of Americans said tighter controls on immigration would do "a great deal" to enhance U.S. national security. Harvard political scientist and historian Samuel P. Huntington argued in his 2004 book Who Are We? The Challenges to America's National Identity that a potential future consequence of continuing massive immigration from Latin America, especially Mexico, could lead to the bifurcation of the United States.

The estimated population of illegal Mexican immigrants in the US decreased from approximately 7 million in 2007 to 6.1 million in 2011 Commentators link the reversal of the immigration trend to the economic downturn that started in 2008 and which meant fewer available jobs, and to the introduction of tough immigration laws in many states. According to the Pew Hispanic Center, the net immigration of Mexican born persons had stagnated in 2010, and tended toward going into negative figures.

More than 80 cities in the United States, including Washington D.C., New York City, Los Angeles, Chicago, San Francisco, San Diego, San Jose, Salt Lake City, Phoenix, Dallas, Fort Worth, Houston, Detroit, Jersey City, Minneapolis, Denver, Baltimore, Seattle, Portland, Oregon and Portland, Maine, have sanctuary policies, which vary locally.

Origin countries

Source: US Department of Homeland Security, Office of Immigration Statistics

Charts

Demography

Extent and destinations

 2010, 2017, 2018

The United States admitted more legal immigrants from 1991 to 2000, between ten and eleven million, than in any previous decade. In the most recent decade, the 10 million legal immigrants that settled in the U.S. represent roughly one third of the annual growth, as the U.S. population increased by 32 million (from 249 million to 281 million). By comparison, the highest previous decade was the 1900s, when 8.8 million people arrived, increasing the total U.S. population by one percent every year. Specifically, "nearly 15% of Americans were foreign-born in 1910, while in 1999, only about 10% were foreign-born".

By 1970, immigrants accounted for 4.7 percent of the US population and rising to 6.2 percent in 1980, with an estimated 12.5 percent in 2009. , 25% of US residents under age 18 were first- or second-generation immigrants. Eight percent of all babies born in the U.S. in 2008 belonged to illegal immigrant parents, according to a recent analysis of U.S. Census Bureau data by the Pew Hispanic Center.

Legal immigration to the U.S. increased from 250,000 in the 1930s, to 2.5 million in the 1950s, to 4.5 million in the 1970s, and to 7.3 million in the 1980s, before becoming stable at about 10 million in the 1990s. Since 2000, legal immigrants to the United States number approximately 1,000,000 per year, of whom about 600,000 are Change of Status who already are in the U.S. Legal immigrants to the United States now are at their highest level ever, at just over 37,000,000 legal immigrants. In reports in 2005–2006, estimates of illegal immigration ranged from 700,000 to 1,500,000 per year. Immigration led to a 57.4% increase in foreign-born population from 1990 to 2000.

Foreign-born immigration has caused the U.S. population to continue its rapid increase with the foreign-born population doubling from almost 20 million in 1990 to over 47 million in 2015. In 2018, there were almost 90 million immigrants and U.S.-born children of immigrants (second-generation Americans) in the United States, accounting for 28% of the overall U.S. population.

While immigration has increased drastically over the 20th century, the foreign-born share of the population is, at 13.4, only somewhat below what it was at its peak in 1910 at 14.7%. A number of factors may be attributed to the decrease in the representation of foreign-born residents in the United States. Most significant has been the change in the composition of immigrants; prior to 1890, 82% of immigrants came from North and Western Europe. From 1891 to 1920, that number decreased to 25%, with a rise in immigrants from East, Central, and South Europe, summing up to 64%. Animosity towards these different and foreign immigrants increased in the United States, resulting in much legislation to limit immigration.

Contemporary immigrants settle predominantly in seven states, California, New York, Florida, Texas, Pennsylvania, New Jersey and Illinois, comprising about 44% of the U.S. population as a whole. The combined total immigrant population of these seven states was 70% of the total foreign-born population in 2000.

Origin

Foreign-born population in the United States in 2019 by country of birth

Effects of immigration

Immigration to the United States significantly increases the population. The Census Bureau estimates that the US population will increase from 317 million in 2014 to 417 million in 2060 with immigration, when nearly 20% will be foreign-born. In particular, the population of Hispanic and Asian Americans is significantly increased by immigration, with both populations expected to see major growth. Overall, the Pew Report predicts the population of the United States will rise from 296 million in 2005 to 441 million in 2065, but only to 338 million with no immigration. The prevalence of immigrant segregation has brought into question the accuracy of describing the United States as a melting pot. Immigration to the United States has also increased religious diversity, with Islam, Hinduism, Buddhism, and Sikhism growing in the United States due to immigration. Changing demographics as a result of immigration have affected political affiliations. Immigrants are more likely than natives to support the Democratic Party. Interest groups that lobby for and against immigration play a role in immigration policy, with religious, ethnic, and business groups most likely to lobby on issues of immigration.

Immigrants have not been found to increase crime in the United States, and immigrants overall are associated with lower crime rates than natives. Some research even suggests that increases in immigration may partly explain the reduction in the U.S. crime rate. According to one study, sanctuary cities—which adopt policies designed to not prosecute people solely for being an illegal immigrant—have no statistically meaningful effect on crime. Research suggests that police practices, such as racial profiling, over-policing in areas populated by minorities and in-group bias may result in disproportionately high numbers of immigrants among crime suspects. Research also suggests that there may be possible discrimination by the judicial system, which contributes to a higher number of convictions for immigrants. Crimmigration has emerged as a field in which critical immigration scholars conceptualize the current immigration law enforcement system.

Increased immigration to the United States has historically caused discrimination and racial unrest. Areas with higher minority populations may be subject to increased policing  and harsher sentencing. Faculty in educational facilities have been found to be more responsive toward white students, though affirmative action policies may cause colleges to favor minority applicants. Evidence also shows the existence of racial discrimination in the housing market and the labor market. Discrimination also exists between different immigrant groups. According to a 2018 study of longitudinal earnings, most immigrants economically assimilate into the United States within a span of 20 years, matching the economic situations of non-immigrants of similar race and ethnicity.

Immigration has been found to have little impact on the health of natives. Researchers have also found what is known as the "healthy immigrant effect", in which immigrants in general tend to be healthier than individuals born in the U.S. However, some illnesses are believed to have been introduced to the United States or caused to increase by immigration. Immigrants are more likely than native-born Americans to have a medical visit labeled uncompensated care.

A significant proportion of American scientists and engineers are immigrants. Graduate students are more likely to be immigrants than undergraduate students, as immigrants often complete undergraduate training in their native country before immigrating. 33% of all U.S. Ph.D.s in science and engineering were awarded to foreign-born graduate students as of 2004.

Economic effects 

High-skilled immigration and low-skilled immigration have both been found to make economic conditions better for the average immigrant and the average American. The overall impact of immigration on the economy tends to be minimal. Research suggests that diversity has a net positive effect on productivity and economic prosperity. Contributions by immigrants through taxation and the economy have been found to exceed the cost of services they use. Overall immigration has not had much effect on native wage inequality but low-skill immigration has been linked to greater income inequality in the native population. Labor unions have historically opposed immigration over economic concerns.

Immigrants have also been found to raise economic productivity, as they are more likely to take jobs that natives are unwilling to do. Research indicates that immigrants are more likely to work in risky jobs than U.S.-born workers, partly due to differences in average characteristics, such as immigrants' lower English language ability and educational attainment. Refugees have been found to integrate more slowly into the labor market than other immigrants, but they have also been found to increase government revenue overall. Immigration has also been correlated with increased innovation and entrepreneurship, and immigrants are more likely to start businesses than Native Americans.

Undocumented immigrants have also been found to have a positive effect on economic conditions in the United States. According to NPR in 2005, about 3% of illegal immigrants were working in agriculture, and the H-2A visa allows U.S. employers to bring foreign nationals to the United States to fill temporary agricultural jobs. States that imposed harsher immigration laws were found to suffer significant economic losses.

Public opinion
The ambivalent feeling of Americans toward immigrants is shown by a positive attitude toward groups that have been visible for a century or more, and much more negative attitude toward recent arrivals. For example, a 1982 national poll by the Roper Center at the University of Connecticut showed respondents a card listing a number of groups and asked, "Thinking both of what they have contributed to this country and have gotten from this country, for each one tell me whether you think, on balance, they've been a good or a bad thing for this country", which produced the results shown in the table. "By high margins, Americans are telling pollsters it was a very good thing that Poles, Italians, and Jews immigrated to America. Once again, it's the newcomers who are viewed with suspicion. This time, it's the Mexicans, the Filipinos, and the people from the Caribbean who make Americans nervous."

In a 2002 study, which took place soon after the September 11 attacks, 55% of Americans favored decreasing legal immigration, 27% favored keeping it at the same level, and 15% favored increasing it.

In 2006, the immigration-reduction advocacy think tank the Center for Immigration Studies released a poll that found that 68% of Americans think U.S. immigration levels are too high, and just 2% said they are too low. They also found that 70% said they are less likely to vote for candidates that favor increasing legal immigration. In 2004, 55% of Americans believed legal immigration should remain at the current level or increased and 41% said it should be decreased. The less contact a native-born American has with immigrants, the more likely they would have a negative view of immigrants.

One of the most important factors regarding public opinion about immigration is the level of unemployment; anti-immigrant sentiment is where unemployment is highest, and vice versa.

Surveys indicate that the U.S. public consistently makes a sharp distinction between legal and illegal immigrants, and generally views those perceived as "playing by the rules" with more sympathy than immigrants who have entered the country illegally.

According to a Gallup poll in July 2015, immigration is the fourth most important problem facing the United States and seven percent of Americans said it was the most important problem facing America today. In March 2015, another Gallup poll provided insight into American public opinion on immigration; the poll revealed that 39% of people worried about immigration "a great deal". A January poll showed that only 33% of Americans were satisfied with the current state of immigration in America.

Before 2012, a majority of Americans supported securing United States borders compared to dealing with illegal immigrants in the United States. In 2013, that trend has reversed and 55% of people polled by Gallup revealed that they would choose "developing a plan to deal with immigrants who are currently in the U.S. illegally". Changes regarding border control are consistent across party lines, with the percentage of Republicans saying that "securing U.S. borders to halt flow of illegal immigrants" is extremely important decreasing from 68% in 2011 to 56% in 2014. Meanwhile, Democrats who chose extremely important shifted from 42% in 2011 to 31% in 2014. In July 2013, 87% of Americans said they would vote in support of a law that would "allow immigrants already in the country to become U.S. citizens if they meet certain requirements including paying taxes, having a criminal background check and learning English". However, in the same survey, 83% also said they would support the tightening of U.S. border security.

Donald Trump's campaign for presidency focused on a rhetoric of reducing illegal immigration and toughening border security. In July 2015, 48% of Americans thought that Donald Trump would do a poor job of handling immigration problems. In November 2016, 55% of Trump's voters thought that he would do the right thing regarding illegal immigration. In general, Trump supporters are not united upon how to handle immigration. In December 2016, Trump voters were polled and 60% said that "undocumented immigrants in the U.S. who meet certain requirements should be allowed to stay legally".

American opinion regarding how immigrants affect the country and how the government should respond to illegal immigration have changed over time. In 2006, out of all U.S. adults surveyed, 28% declared that they believed the growing number of immigrants helped American workers and 55% believed that it hurt American workers. In 2016, those views had changed, with 42% believing that they helped and 45% believing that they hurt. The PRRI 2015 American Values Atlas showed that between 46% and 53% of Americans believed that "the growing number of newcomers from other countries ... strengthens American society". In the same year, between 57% and 66% of Americans chose that the U.S. should "allow [immigrants living in the U.S. illegally] a way to become citizens provided they meet certain requirements".

In February 2017, the American Enterprise Institute released a report on recent surveys about immigration issues. In July 2016, 63% of Americans favored the temporary bans of immigrants from areas with high levels of terrorism and 53% said the U.S. should allow fewer refugees to enter the country. In November 2016, 55% of Americans were opposed to building a border wall with Mexico. Since 1994, Pew Research center has tracked a change from 63% of Americans saying that immigrants are a burden on the country to 27%.

The Trump administration's zero-tolerance policy  was reacted to negatively by the public. One of the main concerns was how detained children of illegal immigrants were treated. Due to very poor conditions, a campaign was begun called "Close the Camps". Detainment facilities were compared to concentration and internment camps.

After the 2021 evacuation from Afghanistan in August 2021, an NPR/Ipsos poll (±4.6%) found 69% of Americans supported resettling in the United States Afghans who had worked with the U.S., with 65% support for Afghans who "fear repression or persecution from the Taliban". There was lower support for other refugees: 59% for those "fleeing from civil strife and violence in Africa", 56% for those "fleeing from violence in Syria and Libya", and 56% for "Central Americans fleeing violence and poverty". 57% supported the Trump-era Remain in Mexico policy, and 55% supported legalizing the status of those illegally brought to the U.S. as children (as proposed in the DREAM Act).

Religious responses
Religious figures in the United States have stated their views on the topic of immigration as informed by their religious traditions.
 Catholicism – In 2018, Catholic leaders stated that asylum-limiting laws proposed by the Trump administration were immoral. Some bishops considered imposing sanctions (known as "canonical penalties") on church members who have participated in enforcing such policies.
 Judaism – American Jewish rabbis from various denominations have stated that their understanding of Judaism is that immigrants and refugees should be welcomed, and even assisted. The exception would be if there is significant economic hardship or security issues faced by the host country or community, in which case immigration may be limited, discouraged or even prohibited altogether. Some liberal denominations place more emphasis on the welcoming of immigrants, while Conservative, Orthodox and Independent rabbis also consider economic and security concerns. Some provide moral arguments for both the right of country to enforce immigration standards as well as for providing some sort of amnesty for illegal migrants.

Legal issues

Laws concerning immigration and naturalization include the Immigration Act of 1990 (IMMACT), the Antiterrorism and Effective Death Penalty Act (AEDPA), the Illegal Immigration Reform and Immigrant Responsibility Act (IIRIRA), the Naturalization Act of 1790, the Alien and Sedition Acts of 1798, the Chinese Exclusion Act of 1882, and the Johnson-Reed Act of 1924. AEDPA and IIRARA exemplify many categories of criminal activity for which immigrants, including green card holders, can be deported and have imposed mandatory detention for certain types of cases. The Johnson-Reed Act limited the number of immigrants and the Chinese Exclusion Act banned immigration from China altogether.

Refugees are able to gain legal status in the United States through asylum, and a specified number of legally-defined refugees, who either apply for asylum overseas or after arriving in the U.S., are admitted annually. In 2014, the number of asylum seekers accepted into the U.S. was about 120,000. By comparison, about 31,000 were accepted in the UK and 13,500 in Canada. Asylum offices in the United States receive more applications for asylum than they can process every month and every year, and these continuous applications cause a significant backlog.

Removal proceedings are considered administrative proceedings under the authority of the United States Attorney General, and thus part of the executive branch rather than the judicial branch of government. in removal proceedings in front of an immigration judge, cancellation of removal is a form of relief that is available for some long-time residents of the United States. Eligibility may depend on time spent in the United States, criminal record, or family in the country. Members of Congress may submit private bills granting residency to specific named individuals. The United States allows immigrant relatives of active duty military personnel to reside in the United States through a green card.

As of 2015, there are estimated to be 11 to 12 million unauthorized immigrants in the United States, making up about 5% of the civilian labor force. Under the Deferred Action for Childhood Arrivals (DACA) program, unauthorized immigrants that arrived as children were granted exemptions to immigration law.

Most immigration proceedings are civil matters, though criminal charges are applicable when evading border enforcement, committing fraud to gain entry, or committing identity theft to gain employment. Due process protections under the Fifth Amendment to the United States Constitution have been found to apply to immigration proceedings, but those of the Sixth Amendment to the United States Constitution have not due to their nature as civil matters.

In 2021 a new system establishes by The U.S. Citizenship Act, for responsibly manage and secure U.S. border's, for safety of families and communities, and better manage migration across the Hemisphere, sent by President Biden to U.S. Congress.

Immigration in popular culture

The history of immigration to the United States is the history of the country itself, and the journey from beyond the sea is an element found in American folklore, appearing in many works, such as The Godfather, Gangs of New York, "The Song of Myself", Neil Diamond's "America", and the animated feature An American Tail.

From the 1880s to the 1910s, vaudeville dominated the popular image of immigrants, with very popular caricature portrayals of ethnic groups. The specific features of these caricatures became widely accepted as accurate portrayals.

In The Melting Pot (1908), playwright Israel Zangwill (1864–1926) explored issues that dominated Progressive Era debates about immigration policies. Zangwill's theme of the positive benefits of the American melting pot resonated widely in popular culture and literary and academic circles in the 20th century; his cultural symbolismin which he situated immigration issueslikewise informed American cultural imagining of immigrants for decades, as exemplified by Hollywood films.

The popular culture's image of ethnic celebrities often includes stereotypes about immigrant groups. For example, Frank Sinatra's public image as a superstar contained important elements of the American Dream while simultaneously incorporating stereotypes about Italian Americans that were based in nativist and Progressive responses to immigration.

The process of assimilation has been a common theme of popular culture. For example, "lace-curtain Irish" refers to middle-class Irish Americans desiring assimilation into mainstream society in counterpoint to the older, more raffish "shanty Irish". The occasional malapropisms and social blunders of these upward mobiles were lampooned in vaudeville, popular song, and the comic strips of the day such as Bringing Up Father, starring Maggie and Jiggs, which ran in daily newspapers for 87 years (1913 to 2000). In The Departed (2006), Staff Sergeant Dignam regularly points out the dichotomy between the lace-curtain Irish lifestyle Billy Costigan enjoyed with his mother, and the shanty Irish lifestyle of Costigan's father. In recent years, the popular culture has paid special attention to Mexican immigration; the film Spanglish (2004) tells of a friendship of a Mexican housemaid (played by Paz Vega) and her boss (played by Adam Sandler).

Immigration in literature

Novelists and writers have captured much of the color and challenge in their immigrant lives through their writings.

Regarding Irish women in the 19th century, there were numerous novels and short stories by Harvey O'Higgins, Peter McCorry, Bernard O'Reilly and Sarah Orne Jewett that emphasize emancipation from Old World controls, new opportunities and expansiveness of the immigrant experience.

Hladnik studies three popular novels of the late 19th century that warned Slovenes not to immigrate to the dangerous new world of the United States.

Jewish American writer Anzia Yezierska wrote her novel Bread Givers (1925) to explore such themes as Russian-Jewish immigration in the early 20th century, the tension between Old and New World Yiddish culture, and women's experience of immigration. A well established author Yezierska focused on the Jewish struggle to escape the ghetto and enter middle- and upper-class America. In the novel, the heroine, Sara Smolinsky, escapes from New York City's "down-town ghetto" by breaking tradition. She quits her job at the family store and soon becomes engaged to a rich real-estate magnate. She graduates college and takes a high-prestige job teaching public school. Finally Sara restores her broken links to family and religion.

The Swedish author Vilhelm Moberg, in the mid-20th century, wrote a series of four novels describing one Swedish family's migration from Småland to Minnesota in the late 19th century, a destiny shared by almost one million people. The author emphasizes the authenticity of the experiences as depicted (although he did change names). These novels have been translated into English (The Emigrants, 1951, Unto a Good Land, 1954, The Settlers, 1961, The Last Letter Home, 1961). The musical Kristina från Duvemåla by ex-ABBA members Björn Ulvaeus and Benny Andersson is based on this story.

The Immigrant is a musical by Steven Alper, Sarah Knapp, and Mark Harelik. The show is based on the story of Harelik's grandparents, Matleh and Haskell Harelik, who traveled to Galveston, Texas in 1909.

Documentary films

In their documentary How Democracy Works Now: Twelve Stories, filmmakers Shari Robertson and Michael Camerini examine the American political system through the lens of immigration reform from 2001 to 2007. Since the debut of the first five films, the series has become an important resource for advocates, policy-makers and educators.

That film series premiered nearly a decade after the filmmakers' landmark documentary film Well-Founded Fear which provided a behind-the-scenes look at the process for seeking asylum in the United States. That film still marks the only time that a film-crew was privy to the private proceedings at the U.S. Immigration and Naturalization Service (INS), where individual asylum officers ponder the often life-or-death fate of immigrants seeking asylum.

In the documentary "Trafficked with Mariana van Zeller", it was argued that weapons smuggling from the United States contributed to insecurity in Latin America, itself triggering more migration to the United States.

Overall approach to regulation
University of North Carolina law professor Hiroshi Motomura has identified three approaches the United States has taken to the legal status of immigrants in his book Americans in Waiting: The Lost Story of Immigration and Citizenship in the United States. The first, dominant in the 19th century, treated immigrants as in transition; in other words, as prospective citizens. As soon as people declared their intention to become citizens, they received multiple low-cost benefits, including the eligibility for free homesteads in the Homestead Act of 1869, and in many states, the right to vote. The goal was to make the country more attractive, so large numbers of farmers and skilled craftsmen would settle new lands. By the 1880s, a second approach took over, treating newcomers as "immigrants by contract". An implicit deal existed where immigrants who were literate and could earn their own living were permitted in restricted numbers. Once in the United States, they would have limited legal rights, but were not allowed to vote until they became citizens, and would not be eligible for the New Deal government benefits available in the 1930s. The third and more recent policy is "immigration by affiliation", which Motomura argues is the treatment which depends on how deeply rooted people have become in the country. An immigrant who applies for citizenship as soon as permitted, has a long history of working in the United States, and has significant family ties, is more deeply affiliated and can expect better treatment.

The American Dream is the belief that through hard work and determination, any United States immigrant can achieve a better life, usually in terms of financial prosperity and enhanced personal freedom of choice. According to historians, the rapid economic and industrial expansion of the U.S. is not simply a function of being a resource rich, hard working, and inventive country, but the belief that anybody could get a share of the country's wealth if he or she was willing to work hard. This dream has been a major factor in attracting immigrants to the United States.

See also
 Demographics of the United States
 Emigration from the United States
 European colonization of the Americas
 History of laws concerning immigration and naturalization in the United States
 How Democracy Works Now: Twelve Stories
 Illegal immigration to the United States
 Immigration policies of American labor unions
 Inequality within immigrant families (United States)
 Nativism (politics), opposition to immigration
 Opposition to immigration
 United States immigration statistics
 Immigrant benefits urban legend, a hoax regarding benefits comparison

References 
{{Reflist|30em|refs=

<ref name="interdisciplinary50">Espenshade, Thomas J. and Belanger, Maryanne (1998) "Immigration and Public Opinion." In Marcelo M. Suarez-Orozco, ed. Crossings: Mexican Immigration in Interdisciplinary Perspectives. Cambridge, Mass.: David Rockefeller Center for Latin American Studies and Harvard University Press, pp. 365–403</ref>

}}
 

Further reading

Surveys
 Anbinder, Tyler. City of Dreams: The 400-Year Epic History of Immigrant New York (Houghton Mifflin Harcourt, 2016). 766 pp. 
 Archdeacon, Thomas J. Becoming American: An Ethnic History (1984)
 Bankston, Carl L. III and Danielle Antoinette Hidalgo, eds. Immigration in U.S. History Salem Press, (2006) 
  short scholarly biographies With bibliographies; 448 pp.
 Bodnar, John. The Transplanted: A History of Immigrants in Urban America Indiana University Press, (1985) 
 Daniels, Roger. Asian America: Chinese and Japanese in the United States since 1850 University of Washington Press, (1988) 
 Daniels, Roger.  Coming to America 2nd ed. (2005) 
 Daniels, Roger. Guarding the Golden Door : American Immigration Policy and Immigrants since 1882 (2005) 
 Diner, Hasia. The Jews of the United States, 1654 to 2000 (2004) 
 Dinnerstein, Leonard, and David M. Reimers. Ethnic Americans: a history of immigration  (1999) online
 Gerber, David A. American Immigration: A Very Short Introduction (2011). 
 Gjerde, Jon, ed. Major Problems in American Immigration and Ethnic History (1998).
 Glazier, Michael, ed. The Encyclopedia of the Irish in America (1999). 
 Jones, Maldwyn A. American immigration (1960) online
  Joselit, Jenna Weissman. Immigration and American religion (2001)  online
 Parker, Kunal M. Making Foreigners: Immigration and Citizenship Law in America, 1600–2000. New York: Cambridge University Press, 2015. 
 Sowell, Thomas. Ethnic America: A History (1981). 
 Thernstrom, Stephan, ed. Harvard Encyclopedia of American Ethnic Groups (1980). 

Before 1920
 Alexander, June Granatir. Daily Life in Immigrant America, 1870–1920: How the Second Great Wave of Immigrants Made Their Way in America (Chicago: Ivan R. Dee, 2007. xvi, 332 pp.)
 Berthoff, Rowland Tappan. British Immigrants in Industrial America, 1790–1950 (1953). 
 Briggs, John. An Italian Passage: Immigrants to Three American Cities, 1890–1930 Yale University Press, (1978).  
 Diner, Hasia. Hungering for America: Italian, Irish, and Jewish Foodways in the Age of Migration (2003).  
 Dudley, William, ed. Illegal immigration: opposing viewpoints (2002) online
 Eltis, David; Coerced and Free Migration: Global Perspectives (2002) emphasis on migration to Americas before 1800.  
 Greene, Victor R. A Singing Ambivalence: American Immigrants Between Old World and New, 1830–1930 (2004), covering musical traditions.  
 Isaac Aaronovich Hourwich. Immigration and Labor: The Economic Aspects of European Immigration to the United States (1912) (full text online)
 Joseph, Samuel; Jewish Immigration to the United States from 1881 to 1910 Columbia University Press, (1914).  
 Kulikoff, Allan; From British Peasants to Colonial American Farmers (2000), details on colonial immigration.  
 Meagher, Timothy J. The Columbia Guide to Irish American History. (2005).  
 Miller, Kerby M. Emigrants and Exiles (1985), influential scholarly interpretation of Irish immigration
 Motomura, Hiroshi. Americans in Waiting: The Lost Story of Immigration and Citizenship in the United States (2006), legal history.  
 Pochmann, Henry A. and Arthur R. Schultz; German Culture in America, 1600–1900: Philosophical and Literary Influences (1957).  
 Waters, Tony. Crime and Immigrant Youth Sage Publications (1999), a sociological analysis.  
 U.S. Immigration Commission, Abstracts of Reports, 2 vols. (1911); the full 42-volume report is summarized (with additional information) in Jeremiah W. Jenks and W. Jett Lauck, The Immigrant Problem (1912; 6th ed. 1926)
 Wittke, Carl. We Who Built America: The Saga of the Immigrant (1939), covers all major groups
 Yans-McLaughlin, Virginia ed. Immigration Reconsidered: History, Sociology, and Politics Oxford University Press. (1990)  

Recent: post 1965
 Beasley, Vanessa B. ed. Who Belongs in America?: Presidents, Rhetoric, And Immigration (2006) 
 Bogen, Elizabeth. Immigration in New York (1987) 
 Bommes, Michael and Andrew Geddes. Immigration and Welfare: Challenging the Borders of the Welfare State (2000) 
 Borjas, George J. ed. Issues in the Economics of Immigration (National Bureau of Economic Research Conference Report) (2000). 
 Borjas, George. Friends or Strangers (1990) 
 
 Briggs, Vernon M., Jr. Immigration Policy and the America Labor Force. Baltimore, MD: Johns Hopkins University Press, 1984. 
 Briggs, Vernon M., Jr. Mass Immigration and the National Interest (1992) 
 Cafaro, Philip. How Many Is Too Many? The Progressive Argument for Reducing Immigration into the United States. University of Chicago Press, 2015. 
 Cooper, Mark A. Moving to the United States of America and Immigration. 2008. 
  Egendorf, Laura K., ed. Illegal immigration : an opposing viewpoints guide (2007) online
 Fawcett, James T., and Benjamin V. Carino. Pacific Bridges: The New Immigration from Asia and the Pacific Islands. New York: Center for Migration Studies, 1987. 
 Foner, Nancy. In A New Land: A Comparative View Of Immigration (2005) 
 Garland, Libby. After They Closed the Gate: Jewish Illegal Immigration to the United States, 1921–1965. Chicago: University of Chicago Press, 2014.
 Levinson, David and Melvin Ember, eds. American Immigrant Cultures 2 vol (1997). 
 Lowe, Lisa. Immigrant Acts: On Asian American Cultural Politics (1996) 
 Meier, Matt S. and Gutierrez, Margo, eds. The Mexican American Experience : An Encyclopedia (2003)
 Mohl, Raymond A. "Latinization in the Heart of Dixie: Hispanics in Late-twentieth-century Alabama" Alabama Review 2002 55(4): 243–74. 
 Portes, Alejandro, and Robert L. Bach. Latin Journey: Cuban and Mexican Immigrants in the United States. Berkeley, CA: University of California Press, 1985. 
 
 Portes, Alejandro, and Rubén Rumbaut. Immigrant America. Berkeley, CA: University of California Press, 1990. 
 Reimers, David. Still the Golden Door: The Third World Comes to America. New York: Columbia University Press, (1985). 
 Smith, James P., and Barry Edmonston, eds. The Immigration Debate: Studies on the Economic, Demographic, and Fiscal Effects of Immigration (1998), online version
 Waters, Tony. Crime and Immigrant Youth Thousand Oaks: Sage 1999. 
 Zhou, Min and Carl L. Bankston III. Growing Up American: How Vietnamese Children Adapt to Life in the United States Russell Sage Foundation. (1998)
 Borjas, George J. Heaven's Door: Immigration Policy and the American Economy. Princeton, N.J.: Princeton University Press, 1999. xvii, 263 pp. 
 Lamm, Richard D., and Gary Imhoff. The Immigration Time Bomb: the Fragmenting of America, in series, Truman Talley Books''. First ed. New York: E.P. Dutton, 1985. xiii, 271 pp.

External links

History
 Immigrant Servants Database
 Asian-Nation: Early Asian Immigration to the U.S.
 Irish Catholic Immigration to America
 Scotch-Irish Immigration to Colonial America
 GG Archives Immigration Historical Documents, Articles, and Immigrants
 Maurer, Elizabeth. "New Beginnings: Immigrant Women and the American Experience". National Women's History Museum. 2014.

Immigration policy
 Immigration policy reports from the Brookings Institution
 Immigration policy  reports from the Urban Institute
 Permanent Legal Immigration to the United States: Policy Overview Congressional Research Service (May 2018)
 A Primer on U.S. Immigration Policy Congressional Research Service (November 2017)

Current immigration
 U.S. Citizenship and Immigration Services
 U.S. Immigration and Customs Enforcement
 Cornell University's Legal Information Institute: Immigration
 Yearbook of Immigration Statistics – United States Department of Homeland Security, Office of Immigration Statistics 2004, 2005 editions available.
 "Estimates of the Unauthorized Immigrant Population Residing in the United States: January 2005" M. Hoefer, N. Rytina, C. Campbell (2006) "Population Estimates (August). U.S. Department of Homeland Security, Office of Immigration Statistics.

Economic impact
 

 
American culture
Demographics of the United States
Articles containing video clips